L'As du Fallafel (English: The Ace of Falafel) is a kosher Middle Eastern restaurant located at 34, Rue des Rosiers in the "Pletzl" Jewish quarter of the Le Marais neighborhood in Paris, France. The restaurant is acclaimed for its falafel sandwich served with eggplant and hummus.

The restaurant

L'As du Fallafel's dishes are based upon North African and Middle Eastern cuisine. Due to the restaurant's popularity and cramped seating, the lunchtime line often extends well into the street.

The restaurant is closed on Shabbat.

Acclaim

Writing in The New York Times travel section, Mark Bittman asserts that "this is the falafel destination in Paris, indeed in Europe." In Pauline Frommer's Paris, Margie Rynn shares that L’As du Fallafel "has, without a doubt, the best falafel in Paris."

The restaurant is said to be a favorite of rock musician Lenny Kravitz.

See also
 List of kosher restaurants

References

Buildings and structures in the 4th arrondissement of Paris
Fleischig restaurants
Jews and Judaism in Paris
Le Marais
Middle Eastern diaspora in France
Middle Eastern-Jewish diaspora
North African diaspora in Paris
North African-Jewish diaspora
Pletzl
Restaurants in Paris
Sephardi Jewish culture in France